Miguel Cano Pacheco was a Spanish baroque architect and sculptor born in Almodóvar del Campo, father and first master of Alonso Cano, renowned joiner of altarpieces. The reputation of his work and the accumulation of orders motivated that he was moving from the mancheguian city to Granada, with all his family, two months before his son Alonso was born.

Works

 1601 Altarpiece of San Ildefonso (Granada) Parish.
 1628 Altarpiece of Nuestra Señora de la Oliva (Lebrija) Parish, finished by his son.

Year of birth missing
Year of death missing
Spanish Baroque architects
16th-century Spanish sculptors
Spanish Baroque sculptors
Spanish male sculptors